Kasper Søndergaard Sarup (born 9 June 1981) is a former Danish handball player for Skjern Håndbold and the Danish national team.

He is a double European champion, winning the 2008 and 2012 European Men's Handball Championship with the Danish national team. He also has three medals from the World Men's Handball Championship, a bronze in 2009 and two silver, in 2011 and 2013.

References

External links

1981 births
Living people
Danish male handball players
Olympic handball players of Denmark
Handball players at the 2008 Summer Olympics
Handball players at the 2012 Summer Olympics
Handball players at the 2016 Summer Olympics
KIF Kolding players
People from Skive Municipality
Medalists at the 2016 Summer Olympics
Olympic gold medalists for Denmark
Olympic medalists in handball
Sportspeople from the Central Denmark Region